Magol Commando was a light infantry regiment of the South African Army. It formed part of the South African Army Infantry Formation as well as the South African Territorial Reserve.

History

Origin
This unit can trace its origins as part of the original Waterberg Commando to just before the Anglo Boer War as the Transvaal Republic became more nervous of its British adversaries in Bechaunaland and Rhodesia.

Operations

With the Zuid Afrikaanse Republiek
The Waterberg Commando gathered at Nylstroom on 11 October 1899. After receiving news of the outbreak of war, this Commando proceeded to the confluence of the Limpopo and Palala rivers to join with the Soutpansberg Commando, cross into Bechaunaland and destroy railway infrastructure.

With the UDF
By 1902 all Commando remnants were under British military control and disarmed.

By 1912, however previous Commando members could join shooting associations. The Noorden Grens Schietvereninging was formed.

By 1940, such commandos were under control of the National Reserve of Volunteers. This commando performed the duties of a home guard at this stage.

These commandos were formally reactivated by 1948.

With the SADF
This unit was originally named the Waterberg North Commando but was renamed the Magol Commando around 1972. 

The unit was situated in the Onverwacht neighbourhood of Ellisras, now Lephalale.

The unit initially resorted under the command of Group 14 but was later transferred to Group 29.

During this era, the unit was mainly used for area force protection, search and cordones as well as stock theft control assistance to the rural police.

With the SANDF

Disbandment
This unit, along with all other Commando units was disbanded after a decision by South African President Thabo Mbeki to disband all Commando Units. The Commando system was phased out between 2003 and 2008 "because of the role it played in the apartheid era", according to the Minister of Safety and Security Charles Nqakula.

Unit Insignia

Leadership 

Capt J. Geldenhuys 1912-1939
Capt L. vd Westhuizen 1939
Capt G.O. Mel 1940-1948
Cmdt G.A. Wells 1949-1966
Cmdt M.G. Eckard 1966-1983
Cmdt J.J.S. Erasmus 1983

References

See also 
 South African Commando System

Infantry regiments of South Africa
South African Commando Units